Beaurieux is a commune in the Nord department in northern France. It is about 1.5 km from the Belgian border, and about 25 km from Charleroi.

Population

Heraldry

See also
Communes of the Nord department

References

Communes of Nord (French department)